James Henry Cornford (9 December 1911 – 17 June 1985) was a first-class cricketer.  He was born in Sussex in 1911 and played 322 first-class matches, largely for Sussex County Cricket Club, between 1931 and 1952.  A right arm fast medium bowler, he took 1019 wickets at 26.49 with a best of 9 for 53.  He was very much a tail end batsman, averaging 5.34 with a best of just 34.  He died in Zimbabwe in 1985.

References

1911 births
English cricketers
Sussex cricketers
1985 deaths
Royal Air Force personnel of World War II
North v South cricketers